Functional equivalence can refer to 
 Dynamic and formal equivalence in biblical translation
 Functional equivalence (ecology), a concept in community ecology
 Formal equivalence checking in formal methods